Bladimir Alejandro Morales Duarte (born 9 April 1983) is a Venezuelan football manager and former player who played as a midfielder. He is the current manager of Academia Puerto Cabello's reserve team.

Playing career
Born in San Cristóbal, Táchira, Morales made his professional debut with Trujillanos in the Primera División in 2004. He moved to Zamora in 2006, and was a regular starter before joining Deportivo Italia in 2008.

In 2011, Morales agreed to a contract with Deportivo Lara. He signed for Caracas on 5 June 2013, 
but stayed in the club for just a year before moving to Tercera División side REDI Colón.

On 26 December 2014, Morales joined Portuguesa back in the first division. He subsequently represented Segunda División's Gran Valencia Maracay, where he retired in 2016 at the age of 33.

Managerial career
Immediately after retiring, Morales was appointed manager of his last club Gran Valencia. On 11 December 2017, after achieving promotion to the top tier, he renewed his contract until 2019.

References

External links

1983 births
Living people
People from San Cristóbal, Táchira
Venezuelan footballers
Association football midfielders
Venezuelan Primera División players
Venezuelan Segunda División players
Trujillanos FC players
Zamora FC players
Deportivo Miranda F.C. players
Asociación Civil Deportivo Lara players
Caracas FC players
Portuguesa F.C. players
Venezuelan football managers
Venezuelan Primera División managers
Venezuelan Segunda División managers
Academia Puerto Cabello managers